Minak (also Romanized as Mīnāk) is a village in Owzrud Rural District, Baladeh District, Nur County, Mazandaran Province, Iran. At the 2006 census, its population was 55, in 24 families.

See also

References 

Populated places in Nur County